SK Austria Klagenfurt may refer to:

 FC Kärnten (1920–2009), defunct Austrian football club which was known as SK Austria Klagenfurt until 1997
 SK Austria Kärnten (2007–2010), defunct Austrian football club 
 SK Austria Klagenfurt (2007), an Austrian football club established in 2007